This is the discography of R&B and soul trio IMx.

Studio albums

Studio albums

Compilation albums

Singles

References

Discographies of American artists
Rhythm and blues discographies
Soul music discographies